Polygala persicariifolia is a species of flowering plant in the milkwort family (Polygalaceae). It is native to east Africa and Asia.

References 

persicariifolia
Flora of Africa 
Flora of tropical Asia 
Flora of China
Flora of Yemen